The Maghreb magpie (Pica mauritanica) is a species of magpie found in North Africa from Morocco east to Tunisia. It can be distinguished from the Eurasian magpie by the patch of blue skin behind its eye, the narrower white belly, the shorter wings, and the longer tail.

A molecular phylogenetic study published in 2018 found that the Maghreb magpie was sister to a clade containing all the other members of the genus Pica.

In recent years, the population of Maghreb magpie in Tunisia has been experiencing a decline. Research has shown that the cause of this is nest failure, mainly due to the depredation of nestlings by the Southern Grey Shrike (Lanius meridionalis).

References

Pica (genus)
Birds of North Africa
Birds described in 1845